is a girls' senior high school in Higashiyodogawa-ku, Osaka.

Notable alumni
 Yuko Nakanishi

References

External links
 Osaka Seikei Girls' High School 
 English page

Higashiyodogawa-ku, Osaka
Girls' schools in Japan
Schools in Osaka
High schools in Osaka Prefecture
Private schools in Japan